Bømlo-nytt (The Bømlo News) is a local Norwegian newspaper published in Svortland in Hordaland county. Bømlo-nytt covers events in the municipality of Bømlo and is issued every Wednesday and Saturday. The newspaper first appeared on August 30, 1973 and it is published in Nynorsk. The chief editor is Randi Olsen, who succeeded Stein-Erik Ovesen on June 6, 2011.

Circulation
According to the Norwegian Media Businesses' Association, Bømlo-nytt has had the following annual circulation:
 2006: 3,381
 2007: 3,398
 2008: 3,407
 2009: 3,337
 2010: 3,301
 2011: 3,152
 2012: 3,198
 2013: 3,294
 2014: 3,188
 2015: 3,141
 2016: 3,205

References

External links
Bømlo-nytt home page

Newspapers published in Norway
Norwegian-language newspapers
Mass media in Hordaland
Bømlo
Publications established in 1973
1973 establishments in Norway
Nynorsk